Yengejeh-ye Kord is a village in Yekanat Rural District, Yamchi District, Marand County, East Azerbaijan Province, Iran. At the 2006 census, its population was 36, living in 12 families.

References 

Populated places in Marand County